Mount London, also known as Boundary Peak 100, is a mountain on the Alaska-British Columbia boundary in the Juneau Icefield of the Boundary Ranges of the Coast Mountains, located southwest of Atlin, British Columbia on the border with Haines Borough Alaska. Originally called Mount Atlin, it was renamed in honour of the famous author Jack London (1876–1916).

References

Mountains of Alaska
Two-thousanders of British Columbia
Boundary Ranges
Atlin District
Mountains of Haines Borough, Alaska
Mount
Canada–United States border
International mountains of North America